The Sustainable Development, Spatial and Regional Planning Committee (French: Commission du Développement durable et de l'Aménagement du territoire) is one of the eight standing committees of the French National Assembly.

The committee was created on 1 July 2009 by the split of the former Economic Affairs, Environmental and Territory committee due the increasingly important role of environmental issues.

Organization

Powers 
The powers of the committee, fixed by article 36, paragraph 14 of the Rules of the National Assembly are as follows:

 Territorial development.
 Transportation.
 Equipments.
 Infrastructure.
 Public Works.
 Environment.
 Hunting.

Committee composition

13th legislature 
During the 13th legislature of the French Fifth Republic, the committee was chaired by Christian Jacob, with Jérôme Bignon, Stéphane Demilly, Fabienne Labrette-Ménager, and Philippe Tourtelier as vice-presidents.

14th legislature 
From 28 June 2012 to 20 June 2017, the committee was chaired by Jean-Paul Chanteguet (PS).

15th legislature

References 

Committees of the National Assembly (France)
2009 establishments in France